Urvich Wall (‘Urvichka Stena’ \'ur-vich-ka ste-'na\) is the narrow ice-free and crescent-shaped ridge rising to 121 m on Livingston Island in the South Shetland Islands, Antarctica and bounded by Nedelya Point to the north and Rish Point to the southeast. The ridge is 6.7 km long and up to 400 m wide, and separates Byers Peninsula to the west from Rotch Dome to the east. It surmounts Oread Lake, Montemno Lake and Bedek Stream on the west.

The feature's northern part lies in the Antarctic Specially Protected Area ASPA 126 Byers Peninsula, more specifically in one of its two restricted zones.

The ridge is named after the medieval fortress of Urvich in Plana Mountain, Bulgaria.

Location
Spanish mapping in 1992, and Bulgarian in 2005 and 2009.

Maps
 Península Byers, Isla Livingston. Mapa topográfico a escala 1:25000. Madrid: Servicio Geográfico del Ejército, 1992.
 L.L. Ivanov et al. Antarctica: Livingston Island and Greenwich Island, South Shetland Islands. Scale 1:100000 topographic map. Sofia: Antarctic Place-names Commission of Bulgaria, 2005.
 L.L. Ivanov. Antarctica: Livingston Island and Greenwich, Robert, Snow and Smith Islands. Scale 1:120000 topographic map.  Troyan: Manfred Wörner Foundation, 2009.  
 Antarctic Digital Database (ADD). Scale 1:250000 topographic map of Antarctica. Scientific Committee on Antarctic Research (SCAR). Since 1993, regularly upgraded and updated.
 L.L. Ivanov. Antarctica: Livingston Island and Smith Island. Scale 1:100000 topographic map. Manfred Wörner Foundation, 2017.

Gallery

Notes

References
 Urvich Wall. SCAR Composite Gazetteer of Antarctica.
 Bulgarian Antarctic Gazetteer. Antarctic Place-names Commission. (details in Bulgarian, basic data in English)

Ridges of Livingston Island
Bulgaria and the Antarctic